The City University Club is a gentlemen's club in the City of London, established in 1895. From its foundation until 2018 it operated from the top three floors of 50 Cornhill, of what was Prescott's Bank, a 1766 private bank which became a branch of part of the NatWest banking group. This arrangement was quite specifically intended by and between the bank's partners and the club of which they were founding members when the building was designed. The branch closed in 1999 and was turned into a pub of the Fullers chain.

On 29 January 2018 the club moved to 42 Crutched Friars, the former home of the Lloyds Club.

Membership

It was founded strictly for graduates of Oxford and Cambridge universities who worked in the city, but membership is now also open to those who work in the area. It provides club facilities at lunchtime and for private occasions. The club serves as a lunch club for "brokers, bankers and lawyers". It has no connection with City, University of London, which was given its Royal Charter in 1966.

Subscriptions are based on the member's age and location. New members joining during the year are charged pro-rata, except for those under the age of 25, who are entitled to six months' free membership (this precludes usage of reciprocal clubs).Currently, any intending member must pay a joining fee of two hundred pounds.

It has reciprocal arrangements with over 450 private members clubs around the world, enabling members to use facilities in these clubs, including in London the Oxford and Cambridge Club and the Reform Club.

Notable members of the City University Club have included Prince Arthur, Duke of Connaught and Strathearn, the author Evelyn Waugh, businessman Sir Chips Keswick, and the Lloyd's underwriter Ian Posgate.

See also
 List of London's gentlemen's clubs

References

External links
 

Gentlemen's clubs in London
1895 establishments in England